Sociedad Deportiva Atlético Albericia is a football team based in Santander in the autonomous community of Cantabria. Founded in 1974, the team plays in Tercera División RFEF – Group 3. The club's home ground is Juan Hormaechea, which has a capacity of 1,000 spectators.

History 
In the 2018–19 season the club finished 13th in the Tercera División, Group 3.

Season to season

24 seasons in Tercera División
1 season in Tercera División RFEF

References

External links
Official Webpage 
Futbolme.com profile 

Sport in Santander, Spain
Football clubs in Cantabria
Association football clubs established in 1974
1974 establishments in Spain
Sports leagues established in 1974